Gary Edward Crossman (born 10 March 1955 in Sussex, New Brunswick) is a Canadian politician, who was elected to the Legislative Assembly of New Brunswick in the 2014 provincial election. He represents the electoral district of Hampton as a member of the Progressive Conservatives. He was re-elected in the 2018 and 2020 provincial elections.

Prior to his election to the legislature, Crossman served on the town council of Hampton, including a stint as the town's deputy mayor.

Crossman has Bachelor and Master of Education degrees from the University of New Brunswick in Fredericton. He taught Physical Education for 28 years and then spent 11 years as a principal. He and his wife, Marcia, have three children Katie, Patrick and Gregory and four grandchildren.

References

Living people
Progressive Conservative Party of New Brunswick MLAs
New Brunswick municipal councillors
People from Hampton, New Brunswick
People from Kings County, New Brunswick
University of New Brunswick alumni
21st-century Canadian politicians
1955 births